Edward Francis Lynch (born February 25, 1956) is an American former professional baseball pitcher and executive who played in Major League Baseball. He attended Christopher Columbus High School in Miami, Florida. During his career, he pitched and batted right-handed, and his pitch selection included a fastball, slider, changeup and slurve.

MLB career
Lynch was drafted by the Texas Rangers in the 22nd round of the 1977 Major League Baseball Draft. After three years in their farm system, in which he compiled a 22–27 record and 3.89 earned run average, the Rangers sent him to the New York Mets on September 18,  as part of an earlier deal in which the Mets sent Willie Montañez to the Rangers for two players to be named later. The other player the Rangers sent the Mets was first baseman Mike Jorgensen.

Lynch debuted with the Mets on August 31,  against the San Francisco Giants, and gave up four earned runs in just 1.1 inning out of the bullpen. He won his first major league start on September 13 against the Chicago Cubs, snapping a thirteen-game losing streak for his club. For the season, Lynch was 1–1 with a 5.12 ERA in four starts.

The Mets and Cubs were perennially the bottom two teams in the National League East for the early part of Lynch's career, however, they had evolved into division rivals at the top of the N.L. East by the time Lynch took the mound in the second game of a double header on August 7, . The first game was won by the Cubs, 8–6, on the strength of a six-run fifth inning, which included a three-run home run by Keith Moreland. During a five-run fourth inning in the second game, Lynch hit Moreland with a pitch, inciting a bench clearing brawl. The Cubs won the second game, 8–4.

In 1985 Lynch went 10–8 with a 3.44 ERA in a career high 191 innings pitched. Baseball writer Bill James said at that time that Lynch had the best control of any National League pitcher other than LaMarr Hoyt. By the time he was ready to return, he'd lost his spot in the starting rotation to the young pitchers on the  World Champion squad. The Mets traded him to the Cubs for Dave Liddell and Dave Lenderman. He remained with the Cubs through  before retiring.

As an executive
After his career ended, he attended the University of Miami School of Law, and graduated in 1991. Using his Juris Doctor degree and prior baseball experience, he was able to land management positions with the San Diego Padres and Cubs, where he eventually became General Manager. Ed currently resides in Phoenix, Arizona and specializes in real estate with The Key Team at Keller Williams Sonoran Living. At one point he worked as a scout for the Cubs. From 2010 to 2015, Lynch served as a professional scout in the Toronto Blue Jays organization.

As a coach
Lynch was announced as the new pitching coach for the Long Island Ducks of the Atlantic League of Professional Baseball for the 2019 season. However, he resigned just two months into the season on June 25, 2019, in order to spend more time with his family.

References

External links

Ed Lynch at SABR (Baseball BioProject)
Ed Lynch at  Baseball Almanac
Ed Lynch at Ultimate Mets Database

1956 births
Living people
Chicago Cubs players
Chicago Cubs executives
Chicago Cubs scouts
Major League Baseball pitchers
Major League Baseball general managers
New York Mets players
Toronto Blue Jays scouts
Sportspeople from Brooklyn
Baseball players from New York City
Baseball players from New York (state)
South Carolina Gamecocks baseball players
Asheville Tourists players
Gulf Coast Rangers players
Christopher Columbus High School (Miami-Dade County, Florida) alumni
Miami Marlins (FSL) players
Phoenix Firebirds players
Tidewater Tides players
Tucson Toros players
Tulsa Drillers players
University of Miami School of Law alumni